Gurkha regiment or Gorkha regiment may refer to:
 Brigade of Gurkhas, Nepalese soldiers who serve within the British Army
 Gorkha regiments (India), various infantry regiments in the Indian Army, recruited primarily from Nepal
 1st Gorkha Rifles (The Malaun Regiment), senior Gorkha infantry regiment of the Indian Army
 3rd Goorka (The Kumaon) Regiment or 3rd Gorkha Rifles, an Indian Army rifle regiment
 4th Goorkha Regiment or 4th Gorkha Rifles, an infantry regiment of the Indian Army

See also
 Gurkha, Nepalese soldiers recruited by various armies and forces
 2nd King Edward VII's Own Gurkha Rifles (The Sirmoor Rifles), former regiment of the British Indian Army
 Royal Gurkha Rifles, a rifle regiment of the British Army

Gurkhas